Malleson is a surname. Notable people with the surname include:

 Lady Constance Malleson (1895-1975), British writer and actress
 George Bruce Malleson (1825–1898), English officer and author
 Joan Malleson (1899-1956), English physician and advocate of the legalisation of abortion
 Miles Malleson (1888–1969), English actor, husband of Lady Constance Malleson and Joan Malleson
 Tamzin Malleson (born 1974), English actress
 Wilfred St. Aubyn Malleson (1896-1975), midshipman awarded the Victoria Cross
 Wilfrid Malleson (1866–1946), British general

See also
 Malleson mission, a military action of British troops against Bolshevik forces in Transcaspia